Omorgus pastillarius is a species of hide beetle in the subfamily Omorginae.

References

pastillarius
Beetles described in 1846